Hidehiko Tomizawa (born 1 June 1946) is a retired Japanese high jumper. He won a silver medal at the 1970 Asian Games and placed 19th at the 1972 Olympics.

References

1946 births
Living people
Japanese male high jumpers
Olympic male high jumpers
Olympic athletes of Japan
Athletes (track and field) at the 1972 Summer Olympics
Asian Games silver medalists for Japan
Asian Games medalists in athletics (track and field)
Athletes (track and field) at the 1970 Asian Games
Medalists at the 1970 Asian Games
Universiade medalists in athletics (track and field)
Universiade silver medalists for Japan
Medalists at the 1967 Summer Universiade
Japan Championships in Athletics winners